Oris is a Swiss watchmaker.

Oris may also refer to:

 Oris (magazine), a Croatian architecture magazine
 Oris Fergus, Montserratian cricketer